Radoslav Anev (born 1 February 1985 in Blagoevgrad) is a Bulgarian footballer, who plays as a midfielder.

He had previously played for Pirin Blagoevgrad, Lokomotiv Plovdiv, Slavia Sofia, Lokomotiv Mezdra, Ludogorets Razgrad, Etar 1924 and Pirin Gotse Delchev.  On 23 February 2017, Anev joined Bansko but left the club at the end of the season.

International career
Between 2005 and 2006 Anev was part of the Bulgaria national under-21 football team. For Bulgaria U21, he was capped 5 times.

References

External links
 
 

1985 births
Living people
Sportspeople from Blagoevgrad
Bulgarian footballers
Bulgaria under-21 international footballers
Bulgarian expatriate footballers
Bulgarian expatriate sportspeople in Italy
Expatriate footballers in Italy
First Professional Football League (Bulgaria) players
Second Professional Football League (Bulgaria) players
OFC Pirin Blagoevgrad players
PFC Lokomotiv Plovdiv players
PFC Slavia Sofia players
PFC Lokomotiv Mezdra players
PFC Pirin Gotse Delchev players
PFC Ludogorets Razgrad players
FC Etar 1924 Veliko Tarnovo players
FC Botev Vratsa players
SFC Etar Veliko Tarnovo players
FC Bansko players
Association football midfielders